Siddharth: The Prisoner is a 2008 Indian thriller film written and directed by Pryas Gupta starring  Rajat Kapoor, Sachin Nayak, Pradip Sagar in lead roles.

Synopsis
Just released from prison, Siddharth Roy (Rajat Kapoor), a once famous writer, completes a new manuscript. He re-engages with the outside world, hoping that the new book will restore his reputation and also reconcile him with his estranged wife, Maya. Fate has other plans for Roy, when his briefcase gets exchanged at a cyber café with a similar briefcase containing a large sum of money. Roy loses the only copy of his new manuscript, while Mohan (Sachin Nayak), the cyber café manager, comes under pressure from mob bosses to recover the lost money. In the midst of growing despair about the lost manuscript, Roy is reconciled with his three-year-old son through a scheming housemaid. Unable to find happiness in the money he has found Roy begins to desire the custody of his son. Meanwhile the pressure mounts on Mohan as he loses his job and is forced to go into hiding from the mob. He must find Roy and money at any cost. Based on the ancient text of the Rig Veda, the film explores the theme of renunciation (of desire) as the true path to enlightenment and freedom.

Cast
 Rajat Kapoor as Siddharth Roy
 Sachin Nayak as Mohan
 Pradip Sagar as Amin Bhai (as Praddip Sagar)
 Pradeep Kabra as Aseem
 Gulab Chand Soni as Krishna
 Radhika as Geeta
 Deepak Dadhwal as Lawyer
 Ramesh Rai as Atul Bhai
 Geeta Panchal as Sarita - The Maid
 Krish Bhatia as Siddharth's Son
 Ava Mukherjee as Maya's Mother / Siddharth's Mother-in-law
 Fareed as Sonu
 Sanjeev Jain as Police Inspector

Release
The film was released on 27 February 2009 worldwide.

Reception
Upon release film gathered mixed reviews from critics. Nikhat Kazmi of Times of India gave the film a three star rating saying, "A metaphorical film about freedom and desire, the film keeps you engrossed. Firstly, by its explorations on the leitmotif of greed. And secondly, due to Rajat Kapoor's nuanced, almost minimalist act of a man in torment."

Anupama Chopra of NDTV gave a negative review saying, "Gupta doesn’t explain key points in the film: like why Siddharth, an author who almost won the Booker prize, ends up in jail; why his wife wants to divorce him and why he seems so bereft of money, family or even one friend.  Siddharth the Prisoner sags under its own subtext."

Awards & Nominations

References

External links

2000s Hindi-language films
2008 films
2008 thriller films
Indian thriller films
Hindi-language thriller films